This is a list of countships in Portugal (singular Condado; the title is Conde, for Count, and Condessa, for Countess):

A

Count of Abrantes
Count of Agarez
Count of Agrolongo
Count of Águeda
Count of Aguiar
Count of Albuquerque
Count of Alcáçovas
Count of Alcântara
Count of Alcoutim
Count of Alegrete
Count of Alentém
Count of Alferrarede
Count of Alhandra
Count of Almada
Count of Almarjão
Count of Almedina
Count of Almeida
Count of Almeida Araújo
Count of Almendra
Count of Almoster
Count of Alpedrinha
Count of Alpendurada
Count of Alte
Count of Alto Mearim
Count of Alva
Count of Alvelos
Count of Alves Machado
Count of Alviela
Count of Alvito
Count of Alvor
Count of Amarante
Count of Ameal
Count of Anadia
Count of Antas
Count of Arcos
Count of Arganil
Count of Arge
Count of Ariz
Count of Armamar
Count of Armil
Count of Arnoso
Count of Arraiolos
Count of Arriaga
Count of Arrochela
Count of Assumar
Count of Atalaia
Count of Atouguia
Count of Aurora
Count of Aveiras
Count of Avelar
Count of Aveiro
Count of Ávila
Count of Avilez
Count of Avintes
Count of Avranches
Count of Azambuja
Count of Azarujinha
Count of Azenha
Count of Azevedo
Count of Azevedo e Silva
Count of Azinhaga
Count of Azinhoso

B

Count of Bahía
Count of Barbacena
Count of Barca
Count of Barcelos
Count of Barreiro
Count of Barros
Count of Basto
Count of Beirós
Count of Belchite
Count of Belmonte
Count of Bemposta
Count of Bertiandos
Count of Boavista
Count of Bobadela
Count of Bobone
Count of Bolhão
Count of Bonfim
Count of Borba
Count of Borralha
Count of Botelho
Count of Bovieiro
Count of Bracial
Count of Burnay

C

Count of Cabo de Santa Maria
Count of Cabo de São Vicente
Count of Cabral
Count of Cacilhas
Count of Caetano Pinto
Count of Calçada
Count of Calhariz
Count of Calhariz de Benfica
Count of Calheiros
Count of Calheta
Count of Camarido
Count of Caminha
Count of Campanhã
Count of Campo Belo
Count of Canavial
Count of Cantanhede
Count of Caparica
Count of Carcavelos
Count of Caria
Count of Carnide
Count of Carnota
Count of Carreira
Count of Cartaxo
Count of Carvalhais
Count of Carvalhal
Count of Carvalhido
Count of Casal
Count of Casal Ribeiro
Count of Cascais
Count of Castanheira
Count of Castelo
Count of Castelo Branco
Count of Castelo de Paiva
Count of Castelo Melhor
Count of Castelo Mendo
Count of Castelo Novo
Count of Castelo Rodrigo
Count of Castro
Count of Castro Daire
Count of Castro e Sola
Count of Castro Guimarães
Count of Castro Marim
Count of Castro Minas
Count of Cavaleiros
Count of Cedofeita
Count of Chaves
Count of Coculim
Count of Condeixa
Count of Correia Bettencourt
Count of Costa
Count of Costa Pereira
Count of Covilhã
Count of Côvo
Count of Cuba
Count of Cunha
Count of Cunha Matos

D

Count of Daupias
Count of Devezas
Count of Donalda
Count of Duparchy

E

Count of Ega
Count of Ephrussi
Count of Ericeira
Count of Ervideira
Count of Esperança
Count of Estarreja
Count of Estrela
Count of Évora Monte

F

Count of Faro
Count of Farrobo
Count of Feira
Count of Feitosa
Count of Felgueiras
Count of Fenais
Count of Ferreira
Count of Ficalho
Count of Figueira
Count of Figueiredo de Magalhães
Count of Figueiró
Count of Fijô
Count of Folgosa
Count of Fontalva
Count of Fonte Bela
Count of Fonte Nova
Count of Fornos de Algodres
Count of Foz
Count of Foz de Arouce
Count of Franco e Almodôvar
Count of Funchal

G

Count of Galveias
Count of Geraz do Lima
Count of Gouveia
Count of Graciosa
Count of Guarda
Count of Guazava
Count of Guimarães

I

Count of Idanha-a-Nova
Count of Ilha da Madeira
Count of Ilha do Príncipe
Count of Itacolumi

J

Count of Jácome Correia
Count of Jimenez de Molina
Count of Juncal
Count of Junqueira

K

L

Count of La Ville sur Illon
Count of Laborim
Count of Lagoaça
Count of Lancastre
Count of Lapa
Count of Lavradio
Count of Leça
Count of Leiria
Count of Leopoldina
Count of Lindoso
Count of Linhares
Count of Lobata
Count of Loulé
Count of Lourinhã
Count of Lousã
Count of Lumbrales
Count of Lumiares

M

Count of Macedo
Count of Machico
Count of Macieira
Count of Mafra
Count of Magalhães
Count of Mahem
Count of Mangualde
Count of Margaride
Count of Marialva
Count of Marim
Count of Martens Ferrão
Count of Massarelos
Count of Matosinhos e São João da Foz
Count of Melo
Count of Mendia
Count of Mértola
Count of Mesquita
Count of Mesquitela
Count of Miranda do Corvo
Count of Moita
Count of Molelos
Count of Monforte
Count of Monsanto
Count of Monsaraz
Count of Monte Real
Count of Moser
Count of Moçâmedes
Count of Moura
Count of Muge
Count of Murça

N

Count of Napier de São Vicente
Count of Neiva
Count of Nevogilde
Count of Nova Goa

O

Count of Óbidos
Count of Odemira
Count of Oeiras
Count of Olivais
Count of Oliveira dos Arcos
Count of Olivença
Count of Oriola
Count of Ottolini
Count of Ourém

P

Count of Paço de Arcos
Count of Paço de Vitorino
Count of Paço do Lumiar
Count of Paçô Vieira
Count of Palma
Count of Palma de Almeida
Count of Palmela
Count of Paraty
Count of Pedroso de Albuquerque
Count of Penafiel
Count of Penaguião
Count of Penalva
Count of Penalva de Alva
Count of Penamacor
Count of Penela
Count of Penha Firme
Count of Penha Garcia
Count of Penha Longa
Count of Peniche
Count of Pereira Marinho
Count of Pernambuco
Count of Pinhel
Count of Podentes
Count of Pomarão
Conde de Pombeiro
Count of Ponte
Count of Ponte de Santa Maria
Count of Pontével
Count of Portalegre
Count of Porto
Conde de Porto Brandão
Count of Porto Covo da Bandeira
Count of Porto Santo
Count of Portugal
Count of Portugal de Faria
Count of Póvoa
Count of Povolide
Count of Prado
Count of Prado da Selva
Count of Praia da Vitória
Count of Praia e Monforte
Count of Prime
Count of Proença-a-Velha

Q

Count of Quinta das Canas

R

Count of Ravelada
Count of Redinha
Count of Redondo
Count of Refúgio
Count of Rego Botelho
Count of Rendufe
Count of Reriz
Count of Resende
Count of Restelo
Count of Ribandar
Count of Ribeira Grande
Count of Ribeiro da Silva
Count of Ribeiro Real
Count of Rilvas
Count of Rio Grande
Count of Rio Maior
Count of Rio Pardo

S

Count of Sabrosa
Count of Sabugal
Count of Sabugosa
Count of Safira
Count of Saldanha
Count of Samodães
Count of Sandim
Count of Sandomil
Count of Santa Catarina
Count of Santa Cruz
Count of Santa Eulália (de Pindo, Penalva do Castelo)
Count of Santa Eulália (de Santa Eulália, Seia)
Count of Santa Isabel
Count of Santa Luzia
Count of Santa Marinha
Count of Santar
Count of Santiago de Beduído
Count of Santiago de Lobão
Count of Santo André
Count of São Bento
Count of São Cosme do Vale
Count of São Januário
Count of São João da Pesqueira
Count of São João de Ver
Count of São Joaquim
Count of São Lourenço
Count of São Mamede
Count of São Marçal
Count of São Martinho
Count of São Miguel
Count of São Paio
Count of São Salvador de Matosinhos
Count of São Vicente
Count of Sarmento
Count of Sarzedas
Count of Sebastião de Pinho
Count of Seia
Count of Seisal
Count of Seixas
Count of Selir
Count of Sena
Count of Sena Fernandes
Count of Serém
Count of Serra da Tourega
Count of Serra Largo
Count of Sieuve de Menezes
Count of Silvã
Count of Silva Monteiro
Count of Silva Sanches
Count of Silves
Count of Simas
Count of Sintra
Count of Sobral
Count of Sortelha
Count of Soure
Count of Sousa Coutinho
Count of Sousa e Faro
Count of Sousa Rosa
Conde de Stucky de Quay
Count of Subserra
Count of Sucena

T

Count of Tabueira
Count of Taipa
Count of Tarouca
Count of Tavarede
Count of Tentúgal
Count of Terena
Count of Tojal
Count of Tomar
Count of Tondela
Count of Torre
Count of Torre Bela
Count of Torres Novas
Count of Torres Vedras
Count of Tovar
Count of Trancoso
Count of Trindade

U

Count of Unhão

V

Count of Valadares
Count of Valbom
Count of Valbranca
Count of Vale da Rica
Count of Vale de Reis
Count of Vale Flor
Count of Valença
Count of Valenças
Count of Verride
Count of Viana
Count of Viana (da Foz do Lima)
Count of Viana (do Alentejo)
Count of Vidigueira
Count of Vila da Horta
Count of Vila da Praia da Vitória
Count of Vila de Pangim
Count of Vila Flor
Count of Vila Franca
Count of Vila Franca do Campo
Count of Vila Nova
Count of Vila Nova de Cerveira
Count of Vila Nova de Portimão
Count of Vila Pouca
Count of Vila Pouca de Aguiar
Count of Vila Real
Count of Vila Verde
Count of Vilalva
Count of Vilar Maior
Count of Vilar Seco
Count of Vilas Boas
Count of Vilela
Count of Vimeiro
Count of Vimieiro
Count of Vimioso
Count of Vinhais
Count of Vinhó
Count of Vizela

W

Count of Wilson
Count of Weiss

X

Y

Z

See also
 County of Portugal
 Portuguese nobility
 List of Dukedoms in Portugal
 List of Marquesses in Portugal
 List of Viscountcies in Portugal
 List of Barons in Portugal

External links
Portuguese Aristocracy Titles in a Portuguese Genealogical site - Counts
Portuguese Aristocracy Titles in a Portuguese Genealogical site - Countesses

Portugal
 
Counts